Hybrid martial arts, also known as hybrid fighting systems or sometimes eclectic martial arts or freestyle martial arts, refer to mixed martial arts or fighting systems that incorporate techniques and theories from several particular martial arts (eclecticism). While numerous martial arts borrow or adapt from other arts and to some extent could be considered hybrids, a hybrid martial art emphasizes its disparate origins.

History
The idea of hybridization or "mixing" of martial arts traditions originates in the 5th Century BC. The concept rose to wide popularity during 5th Century BC in Greek Olympic game Pankration, which uses aspects derived from various arts including boxing and wrestling.

Examples of hybrid martial arts 

Aikido S.A. (Japan)
American Kenpo (United States)
American Tang Soo Do (United States)
ARB (martial art) (Soviet Union/Russia)
Army Combatives (United States)
Bartitsu (United Kingdom)
Buttstroke
Close combat (Worldwide)
Combat Hapkido (United States)
Combat Hopak (Ukraine)
Defendo (Canada)
Defendu (United Kingdom)
Emerson Combat Systems (United States)
German Ju-Jutsu
Hand-to-hand combat
Hapkido (South Korea)
Hwa Rang Do (Korea)
Jailhouse rock (fighting style) (United States)
Jeet Kune Do (United States)
Jieitaikakutōjutsu (Japan)
Jujutsu (Japan)
Kami Jutsu (United States)
Kajukenbo (Hawaii)
Kenko Kempo Karate (Germany)
Kickboxing (Japan)
Kalaripayattu (India)
Krav Maga (Israel)
Kūdō (Japan)
Kuk Sool Won (South Korea)
Kun Tai Ko
Kuntao (Southeast Asia - Malay Archipelago)
Kyokushin (Japan)
Limalama (Samoa)
Liu Seong Kuntao (Indonesia)
Luta Livre (Brazil)
Marine Corps Martial Arts Program (United States)
Mixed martial arts (Worldwide)
Model Mugging (United States)
Muay Thai (Thailand)
Okichitaw (Canada)
Oom Yung Doe (Korea)
Pancrase (Japan)
Pankration (Ancient Greece)
Sambo (martial art) (Soviet Union/Russia)
Sanda (sport) (China)
Sanjuro (martial art) (United Kingdom)
Shaolin Kempo Karate (United States)
Shidōkan Karate (Japan)
Shotokan Karate (Okinawa/Japan)
Shoot boxing (Japan)
Shoot wrestling (Japan)
Shootfighting (Japan)
Shooto (Japan)
Shorinji Kempo (Japan)
Sin Moo Hapkido (South Korea)
Sli beatha (United States)
Small Circle JuJitsu (United States)
SPEAR System (Canada)
Special Combat Aggressive Reactionary System (United States)
Systema (Russia)
Tang Soo Do (Japanese Korea)
Unified Weapons Master (Australia)
Unifight (Russia/Germany)
Vale Tudo (Brazil)
Vovinam (Vietnam)
Wei Kuen Do (Leo Fong#Fighting Style) (United States)
World War II combatives (United States/United Kingdom)
Yaw-Yan (Philippines)
Yongmudo (Korea)
Yoseikan Budo (Japan/France)
Zero Range Combat (Japan)

See also 

Boxing styles and technique
Comparison of karate styles
Okinawan kobudō
Styles of Chinese martial arts
Styles of wrestling

References 

Hybrid martial arts